Elisabeth Reyes Villegas (born 25 March 1985) is a Spanish model and moderator.

Biography

Model career
She won on 2 April 2006 the title as Miss Spain 2006. Reyes posed for catalogs of Ace & As and Blusens Teleno. Reyes portrayed her Miss Spain title at Salsa rosa, Tan a gustito, and the German magazine Gala.

Television career
Reyes moderated from 2008 to 2009 for Televisión Española. Reyes participated the Dancing show Mira quien Baila for the Spanish Television and came in third place with her partner.

Personal life
In 2008, Reyes was in a relationship with Spanish footballer Sergio Ramos and in June 2009 she dated Spanish footballer Alexis.

References 

1985 births
Living people
Miss Spain winners
Miss Universe 2006 contestants
Association footballers' wives and girlfriends
Spanish female dancers
People from Málaga
Spanish female models